Vicia canescens is a species of legume in the vetch genus that is endemic to Lebanon.

Description
The uppermost leaves may have short tendrils. The elliptic to linear-lanceolate leaves measure 5 to 40 mm in length with entire, semi-hastate stipules. The attractive inflorescence comprises a raceme with 3 to 18 closely arranged flowers with long stalks. The plant produces a villous, oblong fruit, 26–35 mm long and 7–11 mm wide, with ciliate sutures. The fruit contains several seeds.

Distribution and habitat
Vicia canescens is endemic to the mountains of Mount-Lebanon.

References

canescens
Endemic flora of Lebanon
Plants described in 1791